Young Buffalo is an indie rock band from Oxford, Mississippi.

History 
Jim Barrett and Ben Yarbrough started writing music together when they were teenagers and went on to form their first band in high school.

They continued to play music together, along with other friends throughout high school, and it was during this time that Barrett self recorded an EP in the spring of 2009 for a school project (which he failed) under the name "Young Buffalo" (a nickname he had for Ben in school). The recordings ended up being well received locally, and the duo brought the "Young Buffalo" project to life.

In July 2011, Young Buffalo released the "Young Von Prettylips EP" on Cantora Records, an American label noted for signing the then-unknown psychedelic rock band MGMT for their second EP, Time to Pretend EP. Young Buffalo were listed as "new band of the day" by the UK newspaper The Guardian. Indie Rock Cafe included the "Young Von Prettylips EP" in their 6 "Best New Releases" of July.  They opened for the popular English band Arctic Monkeys several times, including a sold-out show in Austin, TX.

In 2012, Young Buffalo signed with Seattle label Votiv and released their self-titled EP, the "Young Buffalo EP", which has been described as "vintage swagger that contributes to the inherent uniqueness of this Afrobeat-tinged indie rock release." The EP was released on iTunes in August. Young Buffalo toured around the US and the UK, including playing South by Southwest, where NPR featured the "Young Von Prettylips EP" single "Catapilah" in their "The Austin 100" radio mix. In November 2012, Paste Magazine premiered the video for "Upstairs" from the "Young Buffalo EP" and described the song as "a step toward maturity and a more cohesive sound" for the band. AOL music website Spinner posted "Upstairs" as "Video of the Day" in December. Young Buffalo continued to tour across the US in support of their EP release with Admiral Fallow and label mates White Arrows.

In February 2013, the "Young Buffalo EP" was listed as the #1 EP in the CMJ Radio 200. The group also stated in an interview in March 2013 that they hoped to release their first full-length album in early 2014.

Members 

 Jim Barrett - Guitar, Vocals
 Ben Yarbrough - Guitar, Vocals
 Will Eubanks - Keyboards 
 Andrew Guinn- Bass
 Timothy Burkhead - Drums, Vocals

Discography 

 Young Von Prettylips (2011)
 Young Buffalo EP (2012)
 House (album) (2015)

References 

Indie rock musical groups from Mississippi
Musical groups established in 2011
Fat Possum Records artists
2011 establishments in Mississippi